Sindia is a comune (municipality) in the Province of Nuoro in the Italian region Sardinia, located about  northwest of Cagliari and about  west of Nuoro.

Sindia borders the following municipalities: Macomer, Pozzomaggiore, Sagama, Scano di Montiferro, Semestene, Suni.

Demographic evolution

References

Cities and towns in Sardinia